The Duumviri navales, were two naval officers elected by the people of Rome to repair and equip the Roman fleet. Both Duumviri navales were assigned to one Roman consul, and each controlled 20 ships. It has been suggested that they may have been in charge of the ships of the Socii navales rather than those of the Roman fleet. The position was established in 311 BC by the Lex Decia.

History
Only two operations of the fleet of the Duumviri navales are known, that they set up a colony on Corsica in 311BC, and that they were destroyed in battle against the Tarentines in 282BC.  Some historians believe that they ceased to exist in 267 BC, and were replaced by four Quaestores classici, However, other historians believe that the Quastores classici acted as auxiliaries to the Duumviri navales, rather than replacing them.

Known Duumviri Navales
Publius Cornelius
Gaius Matienus.

See also
 Duumviri

References

Navy of ancient Rome